Middlesbrough Futsal Club is an English futsal club based in Middlesbrough in the North East of England, playing in The FA Futsal League North.  The club was founded in 2007 and play their home matches in Thornaby-on-Tees: a town in the Borough of Stockton-on-Tees.

History

Middlesbrough Futsal Club was founded in 2007 after the success of the University of Teesside Futsal Club, to reach out to the community and to represent the town in the national league.  Middlesbrough kicked off their existence winning the York Open and finished second in the Northern Futsal Premier League in 2007.

Middlesbrough Futsal Club now play in the FA Futsal League – the official national championship of indoor football (FUTSAL) in England – and the FA Futsal Cup.  They play their home matches at Thornaby Pavilion.

They also compete regionally in the Tees Valley Futsal League and have travelled around Europe competing against some of the top professional teams.

2007

Middlesbrough finished second in the Futsal Premier League Northern Conference.  They played in the FA Futsal Cup finals in Sheffield, losing to eventual runners-up Vaughan's FC in the group stage, but failed to progress past the groups.

2008

In 2008, Boro finished sixth in the first ever FA Futsal League North and retained the Tees Valley Futsal League. They also had two players, Ben Mortlock and Curtis Holmes, called up to the England national team. Curtis Holmes also represented Great Britain Universities in the World University Futsal Championship 2008 in Slovenia.

2009

Middlesbrough had a rebuilding job to do after losing several important players from season 2008, but went on to record their best ever season.

Middlesbrough opened their season with a charity tournament featuring a Legends exhibition match.  The Legends consisted of Curtis Fleming, Jim Platt and Craig Hignett, among other local celebrities.  Middlesbrough also defeated Tranmere Victoria 5–2 in this preseason tournament to signal their intent for the season.

Middlesbrough stormed to the FA Futsal League North title, defeating Loughborough University, FA Futsal Cup finalists 7–3 to clinch the title and went through to the playoffs, where they drew 1–1 with Tranmere Victoria and 5–5 with Genesis, missing out on a shot at the title.

They went out of the group stage in The FA Futsal Cup, losing to London United and Team Bath before beating Worcestor 9–0.  They reached the plate semi final, before being knocked out on penalties to Sheffield.

Ryon Leyshon broke into the England squad and became Middlesbrough's all-time top goalscorer.

2010

Middlesbrough finished fourth in the FA Futsal League North failing to make the playoffs, Mikey Roberts, Jason Kilbride and Robbie Bettson all got selected for the Great Britain team for the World University Championships where they also finished 11th – the highest ever place they have finished.  Robbie Bettson was top goalscorer in The FA Futsal League North with 20 goals.

2010–2011

Middlesbrough finished 3rd in The FA Futsal League North.

Club honours
 Tees Valley Futsal League: 5
 2006, 2007, 2008, 2009, 2010
 York Invitational: 1
2007

2009
 North Riding Futsal League: 1
2009
 FA Futsal League North: 1
2009
 FA Futsal Plate: 1
2010

First team squad 2011–2012

Notable players
There have been a few notable players who have played for Middlesbrough Futsal Club.

  Ben Mortlock England International
  Curtis Holmes England International
  Mathew Payne England Development Squad
  Ryon Leyshon England International
  Jason Kilbride England International
  Ben Everson, English footballer
  Matt Wootton Played professionally in Italy
  Ignacio de Leon Uruguay International
  Robbie Bettson England International

Most goals

References

External links
Official website

Futsal clubs in England
Sport in Middlesbrough
Futsal clubs established in 2007
2007 establishments in England